Ed Young may refer to:

 Ed Young (illustrator) (born 1931), Chinese-born American illustrator and writer
 Dr. Ed Young (born 1936), full name Homer Edwin Young, senior pastor of the Second Baptist Church Houston
 Ed Young (pastor) (born 1961), pastor of Fellowship Church, son of Homer Edwin Young
 Ed Young (politician) (born 1978), American politician
 Ed Young (cricketer) (born 1989), English cricketer
 Ed Young (aircraft constructor), American homebuilt aircraft designer and builder, designer of the Young Skyheater
 H. Edwin Young (1917-2012), academic administrator in the University of Wisconsin System

See also
 Edward Young (disambiguation)
 Ed Yong (born 1981), British science journalist